Andrzej Trzebicki (23 November 1607 – 28 December 1679) was a nobleman and priest in the Polish–Lithuanian Commonwealth.  Vice-chancellor of the Crown from 1652, bishop of Przemyśl since 1655, bishop of Kraków since 1658.

Loyal to king Jan Kazimierz Vasa, accompanied him during his exile and eventual return in The Deluge. Enemy of Protestants, his influence contributed to the exile of Polish brethren in 1658.

Ecclesiastical senators of the Polish–Lithuanian Commonwealth
1607 births
1679 deaths
Bishops of Przemyśl
Bishops of Kraków
Canons of Gniezno
17th-century Polish nobility
17th-century Roman Catholic bishops in the Polish–Lithuanian Commonwealth
Crown Vice-Chancellors